Mudhal Kanave is a 2007 Indian Tamil romance film directed by C. Balamurugan. The film starred Vikranth and Honey Rose in lead roles.

Plot
The movie begins in Kanyakumari where Hari (Vikranth) settles down as painter for his livelihood. He comes across Jennifer (Honey Rose) and gets attracted by her. A sequence of events reveals that she is a married woman. She is the wife of David (Yugendran) in the same village. Hari opens his heart to his employer (Manivannan). A flashback reveals that Hari and Jennifer had been in love for a long time. A sequence of events leaves Jennifer mistaking Hari for no fault of him. She gets married and settles down in Kaniyakumari. Hari is hopeful that he would woo back Jennifer. The rest of the event is all but how Jennifer and Hari get united.

Cast
Vikranth as Hariharan Prabhu
Honey Rose as Jennifer
Santhanam as Sathish
Karunas
Yugendran as David
Manivannan 
Janagaraj as Jennifer's grandfather
Rajyalakshmi as David's mother
Vincent Asokan as Lavanya's brother
Lavanya as Lavanya
Suja Varunee as special appearance

Sound Track 
All songs were composed by Srikanth Deva and lyrics were written by C. Balamurugan.
"Aarusamy Ponnu" - Sabesh
"Beer Venuma" - Shobha Chandrasekhar, Vikranth
"Mudhal Mudhal" - Mahathi
"Yaarai Kettu" - Karthik, Kalyani
"Mudhal Mudhal" - Prasanna Rao

References

2007 films
2000s Tamil-language films
Indian romantic drama films
Films scored by Srikanth Deva
2007 romantic drama films
2007 directorial debut films